Opera Tampa is an American opera company located in Tampa, Florida, where it is resident company at the Straz Center for the Performing Arts.

History 
Opera Tampa debuted in 1996 with its first production, Madama Butterfly. Since then, the company has produced one or more full-scale operas annually, featuring international performers, the Opera Tampa Orchestra and the 50-60 member Opera Tampa Chorus.  Helping to establish the company was composer-conductor Anton Coppola, Opera Tampa's founding artistic director from 1996 until he retired in 2012. A high point for the company under his direction was the world-premier of his opera Sacco and Vanzetti on March 17, 2001.

Today 
Coppola's successor as artistic director is Daniel Lipton, born 1941.9.23 in Paris, who formerly headed Canada's Opera Hamilton in Ontario, Canada in 1986. For Lipton's first season with Opera Tampa, the company launched the "Florida Opera Festival", a month-long series of opera and opera-related concerts and events, including performances from guests such as classical-crossover vocalist Katherine Jenkins.  The festival opened with A Masked Ball (Un Ballo in Maschera) and closed with La Bohème, the company's major opera productions for 2013.

Opera Tampa is managed by its general director, Judith Lisi, who also serves as president of the "Straz" (David A. Straz Jr. Center for the Performing Arts).  The Straz's 2,600-seat Carol Morsani Hall is the primary venue for the company's major productions. Its current musical director is Robin Stamper, an alum of Juilliard School.

Award 

In 2008, Opera Tampa announced it would honor its founding director by establishing The Anton Coppola Excellence in the Arts Award.  The annual award is given to recognize an artist for significant contributions to Opera Tampa and the music world at large, and specifically for extraordinary work in the cultivation and care of the operatic art form.  Coppola himself was recipient of the award in 2012, the year of his retirement.

Recipients by year

References

External links
 Official site

Tampa
Music of Tampa, Florida
Music of Florida
Tourist attractions in Tampa, Florida
1996 establishments in Florida
Musical groups established in 1996
Arts organizations established in 1996
Performing arts in Florida